A nanoring is a cyclic nanostructure with a thickness small enough to be on the nanoscale (10−9 meters). Note that this definition allows the diameter of the ring to be larger than the nanoscale. Nanorings are a relatively recent development within the realm of nanoscience; the first peer-reviewed journal article mentioning these nanostructures came from researchers at the Institute of Physics and Center for Condensed Matter Physics in Beijing who synthesized nanorings made of gallium nitride in 2001. Zinc oxide, a compound very commonly used in nanostructures, was first synthesized into nanorings by researchers at Georgia Institute of Technology in 2004 and several other common nanostructure compounds have been synthesized into nanorings since. More recently, carbon-based nanorings have been synthesized from cyclo-para-phenylenes as well as porphyrins.

Overview 
Although nanorings may have a diameter on the nanoscale, many of these materials have diameters which are larger than 100 nm, with many nanorings having a diameter on the microscale (10−6 meters). As such, nanorings are considered to be members of a sub-class of nanomaterials called one-dimensional (1-D) nanomaterials. These are nanomaterials in which one of the three physical dimensions in a single unit of the material is on a length scale greater than the nanoscale. Other examples of one-dimensional nanomaterials are nanowires, nanobelts, nanotubes, and nanosheets.

Mechanical Uniqueness 
As with other nanomaterials, much of the practical interest in nanorings arises from the fact that in nanorings, one can often observe quantized phenomena which are ordinarily unobservable in bulk matter. Nanorings, in particular, have a few additional properties which are of particular research interest. One-dimensional nanostructures have a variety of potential uses and applications but due to the dimensions of their extended crystal structures, they cannot be grown on discrete crystal growth sites and thus, cannot be synthesized on a substrate with any crystallographic predictability. Therefore, nanorings are most commonly synthesized aqueously by creating entropically unique conditions which induce spontaneous nanoring self-assembly. These materials are much more useful if they can be easily manipulated by mechanical or magnetic forces as many one-dimensional nanostructures are extremely fragile and, thus, difficult to manipulate into useful environments. It has now been demonstrated that ZnO nanorings made from the spontaneous folding of a single nanobelt crystal can be extensively mechanically manipulated without breaking or fracturing, giving them a unique mechanical advantage over other classes of ZnO nanostructures.

Synthesis 
Generally, nanorings are synthesized using a bottom-up approach, as top-down syntheses are limited by the entropic barriers presented by these materials. Currently, the number of different synthetic techniques used to make these particles is almost as diverse as the number of different types of nanorings themselves. One common method for synthesizing nanorings involves first synthesizing nanobelts or nanowires with an uneven charge distribution focused on the edges of the material. These particles will naturally self-assemble into ring structures such that Coulomb repulsion forces are minimized within the resulting crystal. Other approaches for nanoring synthesis include the assembly of a nanoring around a small seed particle which is later removed or the expansion and twisting of porphyrin-like structures into a hollow nanoring structure.

References

External links 

Nanorings: Seamless Circular Structures Could be Sensors, Resonators and Transducers for Nanoelectronics & Biotechnology (alternative link)

Nanoparticles by morphology